Kasabori Dam  is a dam in the Niigata Prefecture, Japan, completed in 1964.

References 

Dams in Niigata Prefecture
Dams completed in 1964